Crossosomataceae is a small plant family, consisting of four genera of shrubs found only in the dry parts of the American southwest and Mexico. This family has included up to ten species in the past, although as of 2021 six species are still recognised. Crossosoma are shrub-like plants which can vary from being 50 cm to 5 meters tall, with small alternating leaves that surround the stem, or leaves clustered in small spurts (fascicles). Apacheria, however, has opposite leaves. Crossosoma has usually white flowers that are generally bisexual and have 5 petals attached to a nectary disk, but in Velascoa the flowers are campanulate and have an extremely reduced nectary disk.

Genera
Apacheria - one species, cliff brittlebush, Apacheria chiricahuensis
Crossosoma  - two species, C. bigelovii and C. californicum. C. bigelovii var. parviflora or C. parviflora was described for plants from the northern side of the Grand Canyon with a disjunct population in Sonora, with slightly smaller flowers than C. bigelovii, but it is not recognised as distinct even at a varietal level by the Flora of North America in the 2015 volume.
Glossopetalon - two (or four species)
Velascoa - one species

References

 
Rosid families